This page summarizes Estonian football in 2020. It contains information about the league system, national teams, beach football and futsal. On 13 March 2020, football was suspended in Estonia due to the COVID-19 pandemic. Meistriliiga was resumed on 19 May and Esiliiga and Esiliiga B were continued a week later.

National teams

Men

Senior

Under 23 
No arranged fixtures.

Under 21

Under 19

Under 18

Under 17

Under 16 
No arranged fixtures.

Under 15 
No arranged fixtures.

Women

Senior

Under 19 
No arranged fixtures.

Under 17 
No arranged fixtures.

Under 15 
No arranged fixtures.

Futsal

Beach
No arranged fixtures.

League system

Men

Meistriliiga

The 2020 season saw one new team. Maardu Linnameeskond finished last in 2019, and as such, were automatically relegated to the Esiliiga. They were replaced by Tallinna Legion, a team that had been promoted three seasons in a row. Manager Denis Belov said that the club were aiming for a top four position, with the debutant making several high-profile signings (these being Maksim Gussev, Pavel Londak and Andrei Sidorenkov). Additionally, two of the top three teams from the previous season hired a new manager. FCI Levadia hired former national team coach Martin Reim, while Nõmme Kalju's new manager was Marko Kristal.  Due to the COVID-19 pandemic, the Estonian FA decided to split the league into 'champion' (top six teams) and 'relegation (bottom four teams) groups after the 27th round. On the 7th of November it was decided that instead of the top six teams playing each other after the 27th round, only the league's four best teams will play with each other once more. The 5th and 6th placed clubs will play a match if the 6th team has a possibility of catching the 5th placed team.

</onlyinclude>

Relegation play-off:

|}

Esiliiga
There were four changes of clubs compared to the 2019 season. Esiliiga B's reigning champion Nõmme United were promoted to the second tier for the first time in their history, while Pärnu and Vändra Vaprus were also promoted, returning to the league after twelve and four years respectively in lower divisions. The three clubs replaced Tartu Welco, Tallinna Kalev U21 and Rakvere Tarvas, who were relegated after the 2019 season. Maardu Linnameeskond was relegated from the top division, taking the place of 2019 Esiliiga champion Tallinna Legion. Due to the COVID-19 pandemic, the Estonian FA decided to split the league into 'promotion' (top six teams) and 'relegation (bottom four teams) groups after the 27th round.

Relegation play-off:

|}

Esiliiga B

The 2020 Esiliiga B season introduced four new clubs to the division: for the first time a team from Lääne County - Läänemaa, and three bottom teams of the 2019 Esiliiga season - Rakvere Tarvas, Tallinna Kalev U21 and Tartu Welco. These clubs replace the worst team of last season - Põhja-Tallinna Volta - and the three best teams - Pärnu JK, Vändra Vaprus and Nõmme United. Due to the COVID-19 pandemic, the Estonian FA decided to split the league into 'promotion' (top four teams) and 'relegation (bottom four teams) groups after the 27th round. The fifth and sixth team will play another match if the sixth team has a possibility of catching the fifth team.

Relegation play-off:

|}

|}

II liiga

 Group A (North & East) 
Compared to the 2019 season, there were three changes of teams. FC Tallinn, winner of the III liiga East, and play-off winner Tartu Helios were promoted from the III liiga, replacing Tartu Santos and Tallinna Ararat, who were both relegated. Meanwhile, Põhja-Tallinna Volta were relegated from the Esiliiga B after just one season. They took their reserve team's spot in the league, who were hence relegated to the III liiga. While two clubs (FCI Tallinn and Sillamäe Kalev) would have been promoted to the Esiliiga B from the results of the previous season, both remained in the fourth tier of Estonian football. FCI Tallinn could not be promoted as they were the second reserve team of FCI Levadia and would have been required to compete in the third tier as Tallinna FCI Levadia U19. Sillamäe Kalev, on the other hand, was yet to pay its debts and was forbidden from entering the top three leagues.

The 2020 season ended with Tallinna JK Legion II winning its first title. They were ahead of the second-placed debutant FC Tallinn by only head-to-head points (5:2 and 3:2 to Legion II) and FCI Tallinn, who were the reigning champions, finished third with 57 points, which is the most points for a bronze medalist. Jõgeva Wolves withdrew their last two games (in addition to one in the middle of the season) and was therefore disqualified from the league. The second to last team was Tartu Tammeka III, who was passed by Tartu Helios in the last rounds. The season's most-watched game was held on 29 July, when Narva Trans U21 defeated Tallinna Legion II. The match, which was played on the Narva Kalev-FAMA stadium, had 202 people in attendance.

 Group B (South & West) 
While in previous years the league had seen many arrivals and departures every season, in 2020, only two clubs joined the league. Two clubs from the Saue Parish were victorious in their respective leagues: Saue, champions of the 2019 III liiga West, made its return to the league after three years, while Harju Laagri made its debut in the fourth tier of Estonian football after winning the III liiga North in 2019. These two clubs will replace Läänemaa, who got promoted to the Esiliiga B (as neither Paide Linnameeskond III nor Tallinna Kalev III could have been promoted), and Kose, who finished the 2019 season in last place and were relegated to the III liiga West. Due to the COVID-19 pandemic previous season's second-best team, Tallinna Kalev III, decided against taking part this season. They got replaced by Kose, who was originally supposed to play in III liiga.

The season was comfortably won by Paide Linnameeskond III, who won its third title in a row. In addition, it is the best result – only one draw and zero losses from 26 games –  in the league's history (Pärnu Vaprus also amassed 76 points in 2004 but had two games more). Due to the fact that Paide Linnameeskond III would have to change its name to Paide Linnameeskond U19, the club opted against getting promoted. Therefore, second-placed Harju Laagri got promoted instead. Also, none of the following three teams (Raasiku Joker, Saue and Kuressaare II) wanted to participate in the promotion play-offs and thus II liiga N/E second-placed Tallinn got to play with Esiliiga B's 8th team. The season's relegated teams were Pärnu Poseidon and Kose, who were in the bottom two for most of the year. Põhja-Sakala was third from last and had to compete in the relegation play-offs. In the end they decided against playing and were thus also relegated. The league's top scorer was Kuressaare II's Maarek Suursaar with his 38 goals. The most-viewed game of the 2020 season was held in the second to last round when the champions beat the home team Raplamaa in front of 132 fans.

Champion's match: 

Relegation play-off: 
The play-offs for the last places in the next season's II liiga were held on four separate occasions: first the preliminary rounds on the 8th and 14 November and later the finals on the 18th and 22 November. The preliminary rounds are held between the second-placed teams in the fifth division (the South and West as well as the North and East silver medalists play each other). Due to the fact that the South league's second team Otepää did not wish to get promoted, Rummu Dünamo reached the finals without a game. In addition, their next opponent Põhja-Sakala also forfeited the duel and thus the team playing in Paldiski Arena was promoted to the higher tier. In the North-East side there were more play-off games: while the III liiga North second-placed Tallinna Zenit also opted against promotion, they were replaced by the sixth placed Saku Sporting. In the end the club situated in Saku managed to defeat Paide Linnameeskond IV and reach the finals, where they went against Lasnamäe Ajax, who competed in the Esiliiga B two years before. Saku won their first match at home, but suffered a 0–3 loss in Tallinn.

|-

|}

|-

|}

III liiga

 Group A (North) 
Estonian's fifth tier North division, which has mostly clubs from the capital, had three new teams in 2020. Tallinna Ararat, who got relegated from II liiga after last season, joined the league after nine seasons in upper divisions. In addition, IV liiga's champion Nõmme Kalju III and Toompea got promoted and therefore replaced Harju Laagri (promoted), Tallinna Olympic Olybet and Maarjamäe Igiliikur (both relegated). Tallinna Štrommi, who finished last in 2019, got to stay in the division.

The season finished with Lilleküla Retro winning its third title in the III liiga. The team, who was managed by Tarmo Rüütli, only lost three games during the whole season and ended the year with an eleven-point gap to the nearest rival Tallinna Zenit. The league's top scorer was Retro's striker Dmitry Skiperskiy with his 37 goals in 22 games. The two teams who got relegated where Toompea, who lost 13 games in a row, and Rumori Calcio, who got passed by Nõmme Kalju III in the penultimate round. Due to the fact that none of the teams above the sixth-placed Saku Sporting wished to get promoted, the Harjumaa-based team got to participate in the promotion play-offs.

 Group B (South) 
III liiga South had four changes in comparison to the previous year: both Tartu Helios II and Tartu TRT77 will be debuting in the fifth division, Põlva Lootos returns after a year in the IV liiga and Imavere joins the league after having skipped last season entirely. These teams replace Tartu Helios (promoted), Illi & Jõgeva Noorus-96 ÜM (relegated) as well as EMÜ and Võru Helios II, who will not participate in the league system this year.

The season, which was extremely close-fought, ended with Elva II's winning its first title. They were four points ahead of Otepää, who were the reigning champions of III liiga South. One of the season's best performers were Vastseliina, who managed to be at the top of the table for the first fourteen rounds. Their downfall came in the autumn, when they lost four of their last eight matches. The relegation battle was between three teams - Tartu TRT77, Põlva Lootos and Äksi Wolves. While for most of the season, the trio was extremely close, then in the last few rounds, the Jõgevamaa based team fell behind. Due to the fact that in the 17th round, Tarvastu & Tõrva ÜM withdrew for a second time, they were instantly disqualified from the season. Therefore, them as well as Wolves got relegated. In addition to them, 10th placed Lootos lost to Tallinna Jalgpallihaigla in the relegation play-offs and was also relegated. The season's top scorer was Elva's Karl-Ernst Saal with his 33 goals.

 Group C (East) 
In this season's East division there are four new members. Kohtla-Järve Järve III (promoted), Rakvere Tarvas II, Tartu Kalev and Jõhvi Phoenix, who all have not participated in any division in the last few years. They replace Tallinna Augur (relegated), Tallinn (promoted), and Kadrina as well as Põhja-Tallinna Volta III. After the COVID-19 outbreak two teams - Sillamäe and Koeru - decided also not to take part in the league this year. Therefore, there are only ten teams competing this year. One remarkable addition was made by Phoenix, who signed Vladimir Aga, former Zimbru Chișinău head coach, as their new manager.

 Group D (West) 
Western Estonia's III league had, as III liiga East, only ten teams taking part of the season. After the COVID-19 pandemic, Kose and Pärnu Poseidon II, who were both originally supposed to play in III liiga West, were respectively promoted and relegated one league tier. Also, Põhja-Tallinna Volta II, Tabasalu II, Tallinna Legion III and Tallinna Pocarr will compete and therefore replace Saaremaa aameraaS, Pakri Alexela, Kohila Püsivus (all not taking part of the league system), Saue (promoted) and Haapsalu (relegated).

League champion:

Relegation play-off:

|}

|}

|}

|}

IV liiga

Women

Naiste Meistriliiga
After the conclusion of the 2019 season, Pärnu JK announced that they will not compete in the 2020 season due to financial difficulties. Therefore, both Nõmme Kalju and Pärnu Vaprus will be promoted to the top division, as 
Tallinna Legion, Tallinna Ajax and Kuressaare did not want to join the league. Coincidentally, Nõmme Kalju and Pärnu Vaprus both played in the 2019 Esiliiga relegation play-offs.

Relegation play-off:

|}

Naiste Esiliiga
For the first time in nine years, Naiste Esiliiga is the lowest tier of women's football in Estonia. This was caused by the fact that only four teams applied for the II liiga spot. Therefore, the Estonian FA decided to merge the second and the third tier of women's football. The 2020 season has 12 competitors: five teams remain from last season, three are promoted from the II liiga, three clubs make their debut (Tabasalu, Rakvere Tarvas and Jõhvi Phoenix) and in addition, Tallinna Ajax merged with Paide Linnanaiskond. During the season's main phase, each team played once with each other. After the 11th round, the league table was split in half and every team played five more games.

The season ended with Tallinna Ajax & Paide Linnanaiskond winning their first Esiliiga title. This ended Pärnu's reserve team's streak of winning six titles in a row. Silvermedalists – Tabasalu – spent most of the season right behind the eventual winners. Their title hopes collapsed in the 13th round, when they lost 0:4 to Tallinna Ajax & Paide Linnanaiskond. In the last three rounds they only got three points. Despite their poor finish, they still qualified for the promotion play-offs, where they will go against Meistriliiga's 7th team Tartu Tammeka. Kohtla-Järve Järve's season was extremely unsuccessful as they received zero points and had 141 goals scored against them.

The season's top scorer was Tallinna Ajax & Paide Linnanaiskond's striker Gerli Israel, who scored 26 goals.

 TALLINN → Ajax & Paide, Flora II, Kalev II, Legion

Youth

U19 leagues 
U19 Eliitliiga Meistriliiga play-off:

Main season:

U17 leagues

U16 leagues

U15 leagues

Futsal

Coolbet saaliliiga 
2020 had several team changes in comparison to the previous season. Three clubs changed their names (Tartu Ravens Futsal EMÜ became Tartu Ravens Futsal Ares Security; Sillamäe FC NPM Silmet became Sillamäe FC Molycorp Silmet; Sillamäe JK Dina became Sillamäe Alexela), while relegated Narva Ganza was replaced by Sillamäe Alexela. Additionally, the fourth-placed team of the 2018–19 Esiliiga, Tallinna Augur Enemat, decided against competing in the top tier. Therefore, Tartu Maksimum was spared from relegation and JK Kohila was promoted to the Meistriliiga for the first time.

The main season ended with Viimsi winning firmly and Alexela barely finishing second (fifth-placed Ravens was only a point behind). The other three teams determined the relegated team, which in the end was Molycorp Silmet, who had a worse goal difference than Maksimum. The relegation play-offs were not played between Maksimum and Kadrina because Esiliigas fourth team did not want to get promoted. Also, the final tournament was not finished due to the COVID-19 epidemic. Therefore, Viimsi Smsraha was declared champions. The season's top scorer was Maksimum's Priit Peedo with his 20 goals.

Play-off:

Relegation play-off:

|}

Saali Esiliiga 
In comparison to the 2019 season, only half of the league's teams remained the same. JK Kohila and Sillamäe Alexela were promoted to the Meistriliiga, while Tallinna Maccabi and reigning champions of the Saali Esiliiga, Tallinna FC Cosmos II, decided not to participate in the top three leagues. This saved the 2019 season's last-placed club Sillamäe from relegation, who instead remained in the league. In addition, the league had new entrants in the form of Narva Ganza (relegated from the Meistriliiga) and Kadrina (promoted from the Teine liiga). The final two clubs to participate were the reserve teams of Viimsi Smsraha and Narva United.

In conclusion, Narva United II won its second Esiliiga title with 33 points and Rummu Dünamo finished for the first time as the best independent team. Therefore, they were given the opportunity to replace Sillamäe NPM Silmet, who finished last this season, in the Coolbet Saaliliiga. As Kadrina were the second-best independent team, they were qualified to play promotion play-offs, which they decided not to participate in. On the other side of the league, Narva Ganza, who were in the highest division in 2018, got relegated. In addition, Sillamäe also gave up the opportunity to play relegation play-offs against Rõuge Saunamaa, who was thereby promoted to Esiliiga.

Relegation play-off:

|}

Saali Teine liiga 
The lowest tier of the futsal league system had seven participants in 2020, one less than the previous year. Three clubs remained in the league (Rõuge, Rummu II and Äksi), while four other teams competed in their debut seasons: Aruküla, Otepää, EstNor and Võru Helios.

The season ended with Aruküla Unibox winning each game and therefore being crowned the champions. As a result, they were promoted to the second tier. Rõuge Saunamaa, the team which finished the last two seasons in third place, finished the 2020 season in second and qualified for the promotion play-offs. Both teams secured their places multiple rounds before the end of the season. The league's top scorer was Rauno Randjõe from Aruküla, who scored 31 goals in 11 games.

Women's Saali Meistriliiga 

The second season of the women's futsal championship had five contestants. As there was no second division, the last-placed team did not get relegated and thus all clubs from the competition's debut season (except for FC RaDina) are taking part. One completely new team joined the league, Tallinna FC Ajax. At first, last season's second-placed team Põltsamaa SK Motiiv decided not to compete. However, prior to the start of the season they merged with Tartu SK 10 Premium and took part in the league.

Beach football

Coolbet RannaLiiga — Meistriliiga 

In 2020 the Estonian FA and Latvian FA decided to merge their top beach football seasons. The league consists of five Estonian teams (last year's top four + Türi) and three Latvian teams. While in the beginning it was decided that there will be more than four rounds and a play-off at the end of the season, then due to the COVID-19 pandemic all teams played each other twice and there was not a final tournament. Three stages were hosted by Sportland Beach Pärnu Arena and one round was played in Jurmala. The best Estonian and Latvian team progressed to the 2021 Euro Winners Cup tournament.

The historic season ended with SK Augur Enemat firmly winning its third title (the first two being in 2013 and 2018). Last season's champion Thunder Arvutitark finished second, eleven points behind the champions. The league's third placed team was also from Estonia - Nõmme Olybet managed to reach the top three for the fourth consecutive season. The best Latvian team was BSC LAT, who placed fourth. After the season, the FA decided to award Kristian Marmor as the league's best player, Sander Lepik as the best goalscorer (20 goals) and Markus Lukk as the best keeper. All winning players represented Augur.

Coolbet RannaLiiga — Esiliiga 
Eight teams were originally supposed to take part of the 2020 Beach football Esiliiga season, but Team Viimsi, who did not show up to the first round, were disqualified. While five of the teams remained the same as last year, then Prokon and Tickmill both made their debuts. Last season's silvermedalists BSC Türi decided to participate in the higher division. The first two rounds were won by All-Stars, who were six points ahead of the second-placed JK Fellin. But the leader was unsuccessful in the following two rounds and therefore they were passed by eventual winners Chromotex and Schötlli. Consequently, Chromotex won their second title in a row, while Schötlli were awarded their first medal. The best player of the season was Aleksander Frischer, the best goalkeeper was Kalev Moppel (both Chromotex) and the best goalscorer was Jaagup Luhakooder (Schöttli).

Cup competitions

Tipneri karikavõistlused 

Home teams listed on top of bracket. (AET): At Extra Time

Small Cup 

Home teams listed on top of bracket. (AET): At Extra Time

Women's Cup 

Home teams listed on top of bracket. (AET): At Extra Time
 Flora got a bye from the quarterfinals, because Pärnu announced that they will not compete in the 2020 season.

Futsal's Cup 
In 2019 both Võru Helios and Tartu Ravens reached the semifinals for the first time. In the final, title holders Viimsi Smsraha defeated Tallinna Cosmos in front of 277 people. The Futsal Cup's top scorer was Rummu Dünamo's Dmitri Sui with 11 goals.

Home teams listed on top of bracket. (AET): At Extra Time

Supercups

County Competition
The Estonian County Competition is a league-type competition, where teams from all 15 counties (plus a team from the capital Tallinn) compete to win the title. The competition lasts for 30 years, and each year every team plays only one game. This season's games were postponed due to the COVID-19 pandemic.

European competitions

FC Flora

FCI Levadia

Nõmme Kalju

Paide Linnameeskond

Rankings

1Based on last seasons performances.
2Based on last five seasons performances.

Notable transfers
This list contains the most important player transfers related to the Estonian league system or the national team in the year 2020.

Inside Meistriliiga 

  Robert Kirss, 25–26, FW, from  Nõmme Kalju to  Levadia. 21 November
  Trevor Elhi, 26–27, DF, from  SJK to  Levadia. 22 November
  Marko Meerits, 27–28, GK, from  Narva Trans to  Nõmme Kalju. 25 November
  Pavel Londak, 39–40, GK, from  Nõmme Kalju to  Legion. 5 December
  Joseph Saliste, 24–25, MF, from  Flora to  Paide Linnameeskond. 6 December
  Pavel Marin, 24–25, MF, from  Levadia to  Viljandi Tulevik. 10 December
  Sören Kaldma, 23–24, MF, from  Paide Linnameeskond to  Tallinna Kalev. 17 December
  Sergei Mošnikov, 32–33, MF, from  Palanga to  Paide Linnameeskond. 13 January
  Brent Lepistu, 26–27, MF, from  Lahti to  Levadia. 16 January
  Markus Soomets, 19–20, MF, from  Rende Calcio to  Flora. 17 January
  Maksim Gussev, 25–26, FW, from  Flora to  Legion. 19 January
  Marek Kaljumäe, 28–29, DF, from  Levadia to  Tallinna Kalev. 31 January
  Andreas Raudsepp, 26–27, MF, from  Tallinna Kalev to  Nõmme Kalju. 2 February
  Artjom Artjunin, 29–30, DF, from  Etar Veliko Tarnovo to  Legion. 8 February
  Andreas Vaikla, 22–23, GK, from  Norrköping to  Narva Trans. 17 February
  Aleksandr Dmitrijev, 37–38, MF, from free agent to  Legion. 29 May
  Matvei Igonen, 23–24, GK, from  Lillestrom to  Flora. 22 July
  Albert Prosa, 29–30, FW, from free agent to  Legion. 26 July
  Ken Kallaste, 31–32, DF, from  Tychy to  Flora. 27 July
  Sören Kaldma, 23–24, MF, from  Tallinna Kalev to  Kuressaare. 28 July
  Henri Anier, 29–30, FW, from  Go Ahead Eagles to  Paide Linnameeskond. 14 August

Outside Meistriliiga 

  Erik Sorga, 20–21, FW, from  Flora to  D.C. United. 8 January
  Oliver Jürgens, 16–17, FW, from  Hellas Verona Youth to  AS Roma Youth. 21 January
  Joonas Tamm, 27–28, DF, from  Flora to  Desna Chernihiv. 24 January
  Henri Anier, 29–30, FW, from  Suwon to  Go Ahead Eagles. 1 February
  Henrik Ojamaa, 28–29, FW, from  Miedz Legnica to  Widzew Lodz. 1 February
  Mihkel Ainsalu, 23–24, MF, from  Flora to  Lviv. 18 August
  Henri Järvelaid, 21–22, DF, from  Flora to  Vendsyssel. 24 August
  Martin Vetkal, 16–17, MF, from  Tallinna Kalev to  AS Roma Youth. 26 August
  Kristofer Piht, 18–19, FW, from  Flora to  S.P.A.L. Youth. 15 September
  Oliver Jürgens, 16–17, FW, from  AS Roma Youth to  Inter Milan Youth. 21 September
  Maksim Paskotši, 16–17, DF, from  Flora to  Tottenham Youth. 21 September

Foreign players 

  Manucho, 29–30, FW, from  Liepaja to  Levadia. 9 December
  Edrisa Lubega, 21–22, FW, from  Proline to  Paide Linnameeskond. 13 December
  Nikita Andreev, 31–32, FW, from  Levadia to  Intercity. 5 January
  Zurab Ochihava, 24–25, DF, from  Vorskla Poltava to  Levadia. 14 January
  Eric McWoods, 24–25, FW, from  Narva Trans to  Zalaegerszegi. 15 January
  Evgeny Osipov, 33–34, DF, from  Levadia to  Urartu. 16 January
  Markas Beneta, 26–27, DF, from  Narva Trans to  Zagłębie Sosnowiec. 22 January
  Yann Michael Yao, 22–23, FW, from  Paide Linnameeskond to  Spartak Trnava. 23 January
  Oleksandr Safronov, 20–21, DF, from  Dnipro-1 to  Levadia.1 28 January
  Ofosu Appiah, 30–31, DF, from  Valmieras to  Narva Trans. 31 January
  Anselmi Nurmela, 23–24, DF, from  Flora to  Oulu. 1 February
  Yuriy Kolomoyets, 29–30, FW, from  Vorskla Poltava to  Levadia. 8 February
  Amir Natkho, 23–24, MF, from  Yevpatoriya to  Nõmme Kalju. 10 February
  Pedro Victor, 26–27, DF, from  PKNP to  Nõmme Kalju. 14 February
  Nurlan Novruzov, 26–27, MF, from  Dinamo-Auto Tiraspol to  Narva Trans. 21 February
  Sadio Tounkara, 27–28, MF, free agent to  Narva Trans. 27 February
  Yuriy Tkachuk, 24–25, MF, from  Levadia to free agent. 8 May
  Nikita Andreev, 31–32, FW, from  Intercity to  Legion. 30 July
  Dominik Ivkič, 22–23, DF, from  Fužinar to  Kalev. 5 August
1 Returned to parent club on 23 July.

Retired players 

  Madis Vihmann, 24–25, DF, Flora, unknown.
  Gert Kams, 34–35, DF, Flora, sporting director at Paide Linnameeskond.
  Tarmo Neemelo, 37–38, FW, Paide Linnameeskond, manager at Nõmme Kalju U21.
  Sergei Lepmets, 32–33, GK, Levadia, started playing as an amateur player.

See also 
 Winter transfers 2019–20
 Winter tournament 2020
 Meistriliiga 2020
 Esiliiga 2020
 Esiliiga B 2020
 II liiga 2020
 Estonian Cup 2019-20
 Estonian Cup 2020

Notes

References 

 
Seasons in Estonian football